PKWARE, Inc. is an enterprise data protection software company that provides discovery, classification, masking and encryption solutions, along with data compression software, used by organizations in financial services, manufacturing, military, healthcare and government. The company's products are intended to assist other companies in complying with various data protection regulations such as GDPR and CCPA. The company is headquartered in Milwaukee, Wisconsin with additional offices in the US, UK and India.

PKWARE was founded in 1986 by Phil Katz, co-inventor of the ZIP standard.

Thompson Street Capital Partners acquired PKWARE Inc. in 2020.

History

Compression software (1986–2000)
PKWARE was founded in 1986 by Phil Katz, a software developer who had begun distributing a new file compression utility, called PKARC, as shareware. PKARC represented a radical improvement over existing compression software (including the ARC utility, on which it was based) and gained popularity among individuals and corporations.
Following a legal settlement with Systems Enhancement Associates Inc., the owners of ARC, Katz stopped distributing PKARC. He released his own compression program, which he called PKZIP, in 1989. PKZIP was the first program to use the new ZIP file format, which Katz developed in conjunction with Gary Conway and subsequently released into the public domain.
PKWARE grew in its early years by business from large corporations. The ZIP format proved so popular that it became the de facto standard for data compression and remains in use throughout the world after more than 30 years.

Purchase and expansion (2001–2008)
After Katz died in 2000, his family sold the company to a new management team led by George Haddix and backed by investment-banking firm Grace Matthews. Two years later, the company acquired Ascent Solutions, a large-platform software firm based in Dayton, Ohio.

SecureZIP, a program that combined PKZIP's data compression with enhanced encryption functionality, was released in 2004. In the following years, PKWARE continued to add support for large and small platform operating systems and introduced new features for both PKZIP and SecureZIP.

Shift toward data protection (2009–2015)
A new ownership group including company management, Novacap Technologies, and Maranon Capital acquired PKWARE in 2009. The company's new CEO, V. Miller Newton, steered the company toward an increased focus on its encryption products, in response to growing concerns about data security among PKWARE's customers in industries such as healthcare and government.
In 2012, PKWARE released Viivo, a cloud storage encryption product to help customers secure data stored on Dropbox and other cloud storage services. Viivo received attention for having been developed outside of traditional methods in an effort toward "disruptive innovation" in the emerging cloud security market.

Developing and purchasing expanded capabilities (2016–present)
PKWARE released Smartcrypt, a data protection platform combining encryption, data discovery, and encryption key management, in 2016. In 2018, PKWARE added Data Classification with Data Redaction to support PCI DSS compliance added one year later in 2019.

PKWARE was then purchased by Thompson Street Capital Partners in May 2020. After acquiring Dataguise in November 2020, the companies were merged under the single PKWARE name. Products from both legacy companies were renamed according to the new PK branding structure and the combined company received new branding to support the changes. These expanded capabilities enable PKWARE to offer data protection for structured data, unstructured data and semi-structured data.

Acquisitions 

On May 13, 2020, Thompson Street Capital Partners acquired PKWARE for an undisclosed sum. Under Thompson Street, PKWARE acquired Dataguise on November 10, 2020, for their sensitive information detection technologies ("data discovery").

Products
In addition to its data compression and encryption products, PKWARE continues to maintain the ZIP file format standard in the public domain. The company publishes an Application Note on the ZIP file format, providing developers a general description and technical details of the ZIP file storage specification. This Application Note ensures continued interoperability of the ZIP file format for all users.

Patents

Phil Katz was granted a patent in September 1991, for his efficient search functions used in the PKZIP compression process.
In 2001 and 2005, PKWARE was awarded patents for patching technology used within PKZIP products. In 2005, PKWARE was granted a patent for methods used to manage .ZIP files within the Windows file manager and Outlook.  In total PKWARE holds four patents, has over fourteen pending patents and, as of May 2020, is referenced in over two hundred patents.

Awards
2002
 PKWARE was awarded PC Magazine's Editors' Choice for data compression software.

2016
 PKWARE Smartcrypt was awarded Security Products' GOVIES Government Security Awards for Encryption

2020
 PKWARE was awarded the gold 2020 Cybersecurity Excellence Award for Data Redaction and the bronze 2020 Award for Data Redaction

2021
 PKWARE was awarded the gold 2021 Cybersecurity Excellence Award for Database Security, the silver Award for Compliance Solution and the Silver Award for Data-Centric Security
 PKWARE was awarded the American Business Awards Gold Stevie® for Governance, Risk & Compliance Solution, and the American Business Awards Gold Stevie® for International Data Protection Solution

See also
 Phil Katz
 PKLite

External links

References

Companies based in Milwaukee
Companies established in 1986
Privately held companies based in Wisconsin
Software companies based in Wisconsin
1986 establishments in Wisconsin
Software companies of the United States